The Raid on Kunar was a NATO operation which took place on February 17, 2012. Six civilians, including a woman and a child, were killed in the airstrike and ground raid near the Dewa Gul Valley, "a Taliban stronghold in the Chawki district of Kunar province".

Hundreds of Afghans in Chawki protested NATO's actions. President Hamid Karzai sent a delegation to investigate the incident; according to his office, witnesses confirmed that six civilians were killed in the action.

See also
 Civilian casualties in the War in Afghanistan (2001–present)

References

2012 in Afghanistan
Airstrikes
Civilian casualties in the War in Afghanistan (2001–2021)
History of Kunar Province
Attacks in Afghanistan in 2012
February 2012 events in Afghanistan
Attacks in Afghanistan